The Galleria dei dipinti antichi or the Gallery of Antique Art is a small, but publicly exhibited collection of artists mainly from Emilia-Romagna, amassed by Fondazione Cassa di Risparmio di Cesena, the owner of Cesena's saving bank Cassa di Risparmio di Cesena. The collection spans works from the 15th century to the 19th century, and was accumulated mostly over the last 2-3 decades. Since 1991, it has been displayed in the former monastery of the Celestines, now also the central offices of the bank.

Collection

Gallery

External links

Official Website
Fondazione Cassa di Risparmio di Cesena within Google Arts & Culture

Art museums and galleries in Emilia-Romagna
Cesena
Private art collections
Museums in Emilia-Romagna
Celestine Order